Imusicapella is an internationally-acclaimed church choir based at the Our Lady of the Pillar Parish in Imus City, Province of Cavite, Philippines. The choir regularly sings at the Imus Cathedral and St. Peregrine Chapel.

Formed in 2002, Imusicapella has already embarked in eleven (11) international concert tours in countries such as Germany, Austria, Switzerland, Hungary, Italy, France, Spain, Bulgaria, The Netherlands, Poland, Czech Republic, South Korea, Japan, Taiwan and the US states of California, Nevada, Illinois, Iowa, Virginia, Washington DC, New Jersey, Pennsylvania and New York.

They were the recipient of the “General Licerio Topacio Special Award” during the 2006 Parangal ng Bayan ng Imus for being an outstanding group of the city. They were a 6-time recipient of the Ani ng Dangal Award (Harvest of Honors) in 2012, 2013, 2016, 2018, 2019 and 2020 by the National Commission for Culture and the Arts (NCCA).

Imusicapella has recorded seven CDs: You are the Light (2003), Joy to the World (2003), One More Gift (2005), Cantate Domino (2011), "I'll Make Music" (2015), Imagine (2018), and Go the Distance (2019).

Conductor

Tristan Caliston Ignacio is the founder and conductor of Imusicapella.  Under his leadership, the group emerged as the most awarded church choir in Asia.   He is the winner of:

-  Andrea Georgi]Prize, the best conductor prize in Gorizia, Italy (2018)
-  Prize, a conductor’s prize for the best interpretation of a sacred polyphonic piece in Gorizia, Italy (2018)
- Special Prize for an Excellent Conducting Performance in Debrecen, Hungary (2018)
-  Prize, the best conductor prize for the best interpretation of a contemporary choral work in Spittal, Austria (2015)
- Best Conductor Prize for his Outstanding Artistic Achievement in Lindenholzhausen , Germany (2011)
- Pro Musica Viva Maria Strecker-Daelen Prize, the best conductor prize for the best interpretation of a contemporary choral work in Marktoberdorf, Germany (2007)

Graduated with a degree of Bachelor of Science in Tourism at the University of Santo Tomas, he was a member of the UST Singers. He was a recipient of the Gawad Heneral Emilio Aguinaldo, the highest honors given by the Province of Cavite for his outstanding achievements in the field of music as well as the Col. Jose S. Tagle Award, a young achiever’s award given to Imuseños  who achieved something extra-ordinary. He was also given the 2012 and 2019 Ani ng Dangal Awards by the NCCA.

Presently, he is also the conductor of The Sisters of Mary School Boystown Choir, the Department of Energy Chorale and the Government Service Insurance System Chorale.

He has travelled around the country as a jury of several local and national choral competitions. Internationally, he travelled to Gorizia, Italy to sit as a jury both to the Seghizzi International Choral Competition and the Seghizzi International Chamber Singing Competition for Solo Voice with Piano. He was also in Indonesia as one of the juries of the Dumai National Choral Competition in 2018 and 2019.

Doubling as the group’s tour manager since 2012, he has arranged and organized eight highly successful international travels of the choir in Europe and Asia.

Awards

International choral competitions

International choral festivals

National choral competitions

References

Filipino choirs
Imus
Musical groups established in 2002
2002 establishments in the Philippines